The Australian women's national ice hockey team represents Australia at the International Ice Hockey Federation's IIHF World Women's Championships. The women's national team is controlled by Ice Hockey Australia. As of 2011, Australia has 313 female players. Australia is ranked 30th out of 34 countries in the IIHF World Ranking. Kathy Berg took the team to its highest point, being ranked 20th. She was the longest serving coach. Richo Padjen took over and the team started slipping down the rankings and hadn't been able to recover its former glory. In September 2015, an announcement was made on the Ice Hockey Australia website that Canadian Lindsay McAlpine will be the new coach. Replacing Lee Brown. Lindsay McAlpine is expected to join the team for their first training camp in December.

History
In 2000 Australia first competed in the qualification tournament held for the right to participate in the 2001 Division I championships. Australia lost all three of their group matches and finished seventh out of eight after beating South Africa in the seventh place game. The following year Australia again played in the qualification tournament in order to be promoted to Division I for the 2003 championships. Australia finished third in the group of five which saw Slovakia promoted to Division I for 2003.

In 2003 the International Ice Hockey Federation (IIHF) introduced a new format for the World Championships with the inclusion of second and third division. Australia was placed in the third division and gained promotion to the 2004 Division II tournament after winning four of their five games and finishing on top of the standings. The 2004 World Championships saw Australia relegated along with Great Britain from Division II to Division III for the 2005 tournament.

At the 2005 World Championships Australia competed in Division III and narrowly avoided relegation to Division IV after finishing fifth out of six teams, beating only South Africa. The next World Championship in 2007, Australia improved, again gaining promotion to Division II for the next years tournament. Promotion to Division II however was again short as Australia finished last in the 2007 tournament and were relegated back to Division III.

Olympic record
Australia's ice hockey team has never qualified for an Olympic tournament.

World Championships record
2000 – 23rd place
2001 – 21st place
2003 – 21st place (1st in Division III, Promoted to Division II)
2004 – 20th place (5th in Division II, Demoted to Division III)
2005 – 25th place (5th in Division III)
2007 – 22nd place (1st in Division III, Promoted to Division II)
2008 – 21st place (6th in Division II, Demoted to Division III)
2011 – 21st place (2nd in Division III)
2012 – 23rd place (3rd in Division IIA)
2013 – 23rd place (3rd in Division IIA)
2014 – 26th place (6th in Division IIA, Demoted to Division IIB)
2015 – 31st place (5th in Division IIB)
2016 – 27th place (1st in Division IIB, Promoted to Division IIA)
2017 – 26th place (6th in Division IIA)
2018 – 25th place (4th in Division IIA)
2019 – 28th place (6th in Division IIA, Demoted to Division IIB)
2020 – 29th place (1st in Division IIB, Promoted to Division IIA)
2021 – Cancelled due to the COVID-19 pandemic
2022 – 28th place (2nd in Division IIB)
2023 – 30th place (2nd in Division IIB)

Team

Current roster
For the 2022 IIHF Women's World Championship Division II Group B

Staff
For the 2022 IIHF Women's World Championship Division II Group B
Head coach: Stuart Philps
Assistant coach: Paul Graham
General Manager: Bronwyn Lukowiak
Team Leader: Donald Reddish
Equipment Manager: Jaden Pine-Murphy
Physiotherapist: Shannon Spencer

References

External links

IIHF profile
National Teams of Ice Hockey

 
Ice hockey
Women's national ice hockey teams
Nat